Morganfield is a home rule-class city in Union County, Kentucky, in the United States. It is the seat of its county. The population was 3,285 as of the year 2010 U.S. census.

Name
The city was named for Revolutionary War General Daniel Morgan, who was awarded a land grant for his military service. Morganfield later developed on this land.

Geography
According to the United States Census Bureau, the city has a total area of 2.1 square miles (5.5 km2), of which 2.1 square miles (5.4 km2) is land and 0.04 square mile (0.1 km2) (1.42%) is water.

Demographics

As of the census of 2000, there were 3,494 people, 1,434 households, and 926 families residing in the city. The racial makeup of the city was 82.34% White, 16.23% African American, 0.03% Native American, 0.17% Asian, 0.17% from other races, and 1.06% from two or more races. Hispanic or Latino of any race were 0.86% of the population.

There were 1,434 households, out of which 28.0% had children under the age of 18 living with them, 47.6% were married couples living together, 14.1% had a female householder with no husband present, and 35.4% were non-families. 32.4% of all households were made up of individuals, and 15.1% had someone living alone who was 65 years of age or older. The average household size was 2.37 and the average family size was 3.01.

In the city, the population was spread out, with 24.5% under the age of 18, 9.3% from 18 to 24, 24.8% from 25 to 44, 24.7% from 45 to 64, and 16.7% who were 65 years of age or older. The median age was 39 years. For every 100 females, there were 84.9 males. For every 100 females age 18 and over, there were 81.7 males.

The median income for a household in the city was $38,676, and the median income for a family was $52,864. Males had a median income of $32,831 versus $22,736 for females. The per capita income for the city was $19,251. About 9.9% of families and 12.3% of the population were below the poverty line, including 19.2% of those under age 18 and 15.1% of those age 65 or over.

Notable people

 Nancy Huston Banks, novelist and journalist
 Dwane Casey – Currently the head coach for the NBA's Detroit Pistons. Former college basketball player and assistant coach for the Kentucky Wildcats, and former Minnesota Timberwolves & Toronto Raptors head coach
 Earle Clements – Former U.S. Senator, Former Governor of Kentucky and Former U.S. Representative
 Kassie DePaiva – Soap opera actress known for her roles on Guiding Light as Chelsea Reardon and best known for One Life to Live and General Hospital as Blair Cramer Manning 
 Mallory Ervin – Miss Kentucky 2009 and 4th runner-up at Miss America 2010
 Ed Johnson – Former baseball player
 Larry Johnson – Former basketball player
 Jerry Wayne Parrish – Former United States Army corporal who defected to North Korea; died in Pyongyang, North Korea in 1998.
 Dottie Rambo – Gospel singer/songwriter
 John Selby Townsend – Iowa jurist and legislator
 Thomas Lyle Williams - businessman, founder of Maybelline

Camp Breckinridge
Morganfield is located near Camp Breckinridge, a World War II infantry division camp and prisoner-of-war camp. During that war, the camp comprised  and could accommodate 2,031 officers and 42,092 enlisted men. About 40,000 soldiers preparing for the war stayed at the camp. The camp also held about 3,000 German prisoners-of-war before being deactivated in 1949. During the Korean War, Camp Breckinridge was the headquarters of the 506th Regiment of the 101st Airborne Division and was used for basic training of newly inducted U.S. Army recruits.

The Associated Press reported on May 22, 2007, that families of displaced residents of the area that became Camp Breckenridge have continued to seek more compensation from the U.S. government for their former properties, claiming they were not given just value. Former U.S. Supreme Court Justice Sandra Day O'Connor was named as a mediator in the dispute in February 2007.

The camp was renovated and re-opened in 1965 as the "Breckinridge Job Corps Center". The name was later changed to the "Earle C. Clements Job Corps Center" in 1980, to honor Earle C. Clements, a former Kentucky governor and U.S. senator.

Education
Morganfield is served by the Union County Public Schools, Kentucky. Elementary students attend Morganfield Elementary. Middle and High School students attend Union County Middle School & Union County High School located outside Morganfield. A parochial school, St Ann is located in Morganfield. The Earle C. Clements Job Corps facility is also located in Morganfield.

Morganfield has a lending library, a branch of the Union County Public Library.

Climate
The climate in this area is characterized by hot, humid summers and generally mild to cool winters.  According to the Köppen Climate Classification system, Morganfield has a humid subtropical climate, abbreviated "Cfa" on climate maps.

References

External links

 City of Morganfield Home Page

Cities in Kentucky
Cities in Union County, Kentucky
County seats in Kentucky
Populated places established in 1812